Smock Historic District is a national historic district located at Franklin Township and Menallen Township, Fayette County, Pennsylvania.  The district includes 177 contributing buildings, 4 contributing sites, 7 contributing structures, and 1 contributing object in the coal mining community of Smock. Most of the contributing buildings and structures were built between the 1880s and 1923.  They include the extractive and archaeological remains of Colonial Mines No. 1 and 2 and related coke operations, 109 company built dwellings (92 workers' houses and 17 managers' houses), the Redstone Creek bridge, and the Smock War Monument.  Other buildings include three schools, the company store, three churches, and a movie theater.

It was added to the National Register of Historic Places in 1994.

References

External links

Historic districts on the National Register of Historic Places in Pennsylvania
Historic districts in Fayette County, Pennsylvania
National Register of Historic Places in Fayette County, Pennsylvania